Suzannah Dunn is a British author and graduate of the MA creative writing programme at the University of East Anglia, in Norwich, United Kingdom. She was Director of the MA in Novel Writing at the University of Manchester 1999-2005.  Dunn won a Betty Trask Award in 1991 for her novel, Quite Contrary. Dunn's novel The Queen of Subtleties: A Novel of Anne Boleyn details the life of the Tudor Queen
and contrasts it with the fictional Lucy Cornwallis, the royal confectioner. A review of The Queen of Subtleties took issue with the character of Lucy but also stated: "Dunn's blend of fiction and real events works and the personal perspective she offers is interesting."

Bibliography

Darker Days Than Usual (1990) 
Quite Contrary (1991) 
Blood Sugar (1994) 
Venus Flaring (1996) 
Tenterhooks (1998) 
Commencing Our Descent (2000) 
Past Caring (2000) 
The Queen of Subtleties: A Novel of Anne Boleyn (2004) 
The Sixth Wife (2007) 
The Queen's Sorrow (2008) 
The Confession of Katherine Howard (2010) 
 The May Bride (2014) 
 The Lady of Misrule (2015)

References

English women novelists
English historical novelists
Writers of historical romances
Alumni of the University of East Anglia
Academics of the University of Manchester
Writers of historical fiction set in the early modern period
Year of birth missing (living people)
Living people
Women romantic fiction writers
Women historical novelists